Hawkinsville is a city in and county seat of Pulaski County, Georgia, United States.

Hawkinsville may also refer to:

Places
 Hawkinsville, California, USA, an unincorporated community in Siskiyou County
 Hawkinsville, New York, USA, a hamlet in Oneida County
 Hawkinsville, Tennessee, USA, an unincorporated community in Dyer County
 Hawkinsville, Texas, USA, a ghost town

Other uses
 City of Hawkinsville (shipwreck)
 Hawkinsville and Florida Southern Railway
 Hawkinsville Commercial and Industrial Historic District
 Hawkinsville Opera House
 Hawkinsville Public School
 Taylor Hall (Hawkinsville, Georgia)